Beaver Bay is a city in Lake County, Minnesota, United States. The population was 120 at the 2020 census.

Minnesota Highway 61 serves as a main route in the community.

History
Beaver Bay is the oldest settlement on the North Shore of Lake Superior.  It was established in 1856.

The community is also the home of the annual John Beargrease Dog Sled Race.

Geography

The Beaver River flows through the community.  The river flows into Lake Superior.

Beaver Bay is located 3 miles southwest of Silver Bay, 24 miles northeast of Two Harbors, and 51 miles northeast of Duluth.

It is along Minnesota Highway 61. Other routes include Lake County Road 4, Lax Lake Road.

Split Rock Lighthouse State Park is 5 miles southwest of Beaver Bay.

Demographics

2010 census
As of the census of 2010, there were 181 people, 84 households, and 48 families living in the city. The racial makeup of the city was 91.7% White, 1.1% African American, 1.7% Native American, and 5.5% from two or more races.

There were 84 households, of which 22.6% had children under the age of 18 living with them, 36.9% were married couples living together, 13.1% had a female householder with no husband present, 7.1% had a male householder with no wife present, and 42.9% were non-families. 38.1% of all households were made up of individuals, and 8.3% had someone living alone who was 65 years of age or older. The average household size was 2.15 and the average family size was 2.73.

The median age in the city was 45.8 years. 23.8% of residents were under the age of 18; 8.8% were between the ages of 18 and 24; 16.6% were from 25 to 44; 32% were from 45 to 64; and 18.8% were 65 years of age or older. The gender makeup of the city was 65.7% male and 34.3% female.

2000 census
As of the census of 2000, there were 175 people, 93 households, and 50 families living in the city. The racial makeup of the city was 92.57% White, 2.86% African American, 2.29% Native American, 0.57% Asian, and 1.71% from two or more races. Hispanic or Latino of any race were 0.57% of the population. 38.3% were of Norwegian, 11.7% German, 9.2% American, 9.2% Swedish, 5.8% Finnish, 5.0% English, and 5.0% Irish ancestry.

There were 93 households, out of which 14.0% had children under the age of 18 living with them, 40.9% were married couples living together, 8.6% had a female householder with no husband present, and 46.2% were non-families. Individuals comprised 40.9% of all households, and 10.8% had someone living alone who was 65 years of age or older. The average household size was 1.88 and the average family size was 2.48.

In the city, the population was spread out, with 15.4% under the age of 18, 10.9% from 18 to 24, 23.4% from 25 to 44, 28.6% from 45 to 64, and 21.7% who were 65 years of age or older. The median age was 46 years. For every 100 females, there were 121.5 males. For every 100 females age 18 and over, there were 120.9 males.

The median income for a household in the city was $30,000, and the median income for a family was $47,500. Males had a median income of $30,893 versus $17,500 for females. The per capita income for the city was $18,415. About 15.9% of families and 21.2% of the population were below the poverty line, including 44.0% of those under the age of eighteen and 7.4% of those sixty-five or over.

References

External links
 Beaver Bay, MN – Official Website

Cities in Minnesota
Cities in Lake County, Minnesota
Minnesota populated places on Lake Superior